The Girl from Porcupine is a 1921 American silent Western film directed by Dell Henderson and starring Faire Binney, William Collier Jr. and Jack Drumier.

Cast
 Faire Binney as Hope Dugan
 William Collier Jr. as Jim McTvish
 Jack Drumier as Bill Higgins
 James Milady as Sam Hawks
 Adolph Milar as Red McTavish
 Tom Blake as Dugan
 Marcia Harris as Schoolteacher
 Jack Hopkins as Her Brother
 Sam J. Ryan as Brandt
 Gus Pixley as Miller
 Mary Malatesta as Mrs Miller
 Tom Wallace as First holdup man
 Ben Lewis as Second holdup man

References

External links
 

1921 films
1921 Western (genre) films
Films directed by Dell Henderson
Arrow Film Corporation films
Silent American Western (genre) films
1920s English-language films
1920s American films